The history of Peoria, Illinois, began when lands that eventually would become Peoria were first settled in 1680, when French explorers René-Robert Cavelier, Sieur de La Salle, and Henri de Tonti constructed Fort Crevecoeur. This fort later burned to the ground, and in 1813 Fort Clark was built. When the County of Peoria was organized in 1825, Fort Clark was officially named Peoria.

Early history
What has become Peoria and environs bears many remnants of Native Americans. Artifacts and Native American burial mounds show that people lived in the area as far back as 10,000 BC.

17th century
The French were the first Europeans to explore the area that would become Peoria in 1673. Father Jacques Marquette and Louis Joliet explored the region, finding the Illini Indians who were part of the Algonquian people. Those tribes that were part of the Illinois Confederacy at that time were the Peoria, Kaskaskia, Michigamea, Cahokia, and Tamaroa.

In 1680, two French explorers, René-Robert Cavelier, Sieur de La Salle and Henri de Tonti, constructed the first fort on the east bank of the Illinois River, and named it Fort Crèvecœur. Eleven years later, in 1691, another fort was built by de Tonti and his cousin, François Daupin de la Forêt.  It is believed the fort was near present-day Mary and Adams Streets. Called Fort St. Louis du Pimiteoui, it is also known as Fort Pimiteoui. The fort, and the town established around it, was the first European settlement in Illinois.

18th century

The settlement became legally British in 1763 after the French & Indian War, but remained French in practice. By 1778 the village had become part of the territory of the new United States, and George Rogers Clark appointed Maillet as military commander. It later became known as "La Ville de Maillet" and was on the present-day site of downtown Peoria. The new village was considered to be better situated, and by 1796 or 1797, all the inhabitants of the old village had moved to the new.

According to at least one document, the first black resident of Peoria was a man named Jean Baptiste Point du Sable. A document shows that he purchased a house and land on March 13, 1773 and remained there until at least 1783, where he was still on record as the head of a house.

19th century

In August 1828 a treaty between the US and the Winnebago, Pottawatomie, Chippewa, and Ottawa established a ferry crossing over the Rock River where the road to Fort Clark met the river.
(I believe this paragraph to be in error. The sighted source <4> states fort clark road at the rock river. No match of this description will satisfy a peoria location)

Peoria was incorporated as a town in 1835, having then a population of about 1,600.  In 1845, it was incorporated as a city.

During the later half of the 19th century vaudeville became widely popular. Peoria was a main stop on the circuits and the phrase "Will it play in Peoria?" came about.

Bradley Polytechnic Institute (later Bradley University) was founded by philanthropist Lydia Moss Bradley in 1897.

20th century
On May 1, 1973, three armed gunmen held a classroom of fifth-grade students hostage at St. Cecilia Catholic grade school. One hostage was John Ardis, younger brother of Mayor Jim Ardis. The stand-off lasted 90 minutes with only one casualty: one of the gunmen.

21st century

2000s

The revision of Interstates 74 and 474, and work on the McClugage Bridge, were completed. Peoria's Catholic bishop, John J. Myers, hosted a visit by Blessed Mother Teresa of Calcutta and was named Archbishop of Newark in 2001, shortly after September 11.  The University Street and Pekin campuses of Illinois Central College were completed.  OSF Saint Francis Medical Center started Peoria's largest-ever private building expansion to build a new emergency room and a new Children's Hospital of Illinois; and Methodist Medical Center of Illinois and Pekin Hospital also expanded.  U.S. Representative Ray LaHood became U.S. Secretary of Transportation under President Barack Obama; he was succeeded by Aaron Schock.  The Peoria Zoo made a major expansion and the Peoria airport was renamed after Peoria native Wayne Downing, a retired general.

2010s
Peoria District 150, suffering from high levels of student poverty and red ink, closes Woodruff High School and decides whether to construct a new Glen Oak School and a charter school; Peoria Notre Dame High School decides to explore construction of a new high school, but has not done so yet. The Jump Trading Simulation Center is opened and the expansion is completed at OSF Saint Francis Medical Center. Illinois Central College in East Peoria significantly expands its North Campus in Peoria and opens and then expands a new Pekin campus. UnityPoint Health-Peoria buys Methodist Medical Center and Proctor Hospital in Peoria, and later, Pekin Hospital in nearby Pekin. The University of Illinois at Chicago Medical School- Peoria Campus expands and becomes a four-year medical school. Peoria (Central) High School wins its first ever men's basketball state championship. [2004 marked the school's 4th State Boys' Basketball Championship, with the other years being 1908, 1977, and 2003.]  Caterpillar moves its world headquarters, about 300 employees, to Chicago, though 12,000 employees (the largest global concentration) will still remain in Peoria.

Notes

Further reading

External links
 Historic Peoria
 Peoria History on the Peoria Historical Society website

Peoria, Illinois
Peoria, Illinois